David Montrose (August 17, 1905 – February 18, 1977), better known as Newsboy Brown, was an American boxer who held the World Flyweight Title for eight months in 1928.

Statistical boxing website BoxRec lists Brown as the #7 ranked flyweight of all-time. He was inducted into the International Boxing Hall of Fame in 2012. Brown was ranked the second-best bantamweight boxer in the world in The Ring magazine's Annual Ratings for 1931, and the fourth-best in January 1932 by the National Boxing Association.

Early life and career 
Born in Russia on August 17, 1905, Brown emigrated to the U.S. with his parents at the age of three months, though the exact date of his birth remains in some dispute. Raised in Sioux City, Iowa, he learned to fight while selling newspapers on street corners like many young immigrant boxers. According to Brown, he weighed only 95 pounds when he first got into boxing. He began boxing professionally around 1922, and early in his career used the name David Montrose.  In one of his early fights, he acquired the name "Newsboy Brown" when a ring announcer introduced him without being certain of his name. His first eight fights ended in no decisions, but then Brown registered his first official win with a third-round knockout of John Walker in April 1924.

Professional career highlights

NYSAC World Fly title attempt 

In August 1925, as part of the inaugural card for the famous Olympic Auditorium, he defeated Frankie Grandetta by points in six rounds. Brown had two famous bouts against future World Flyweight Champion Corporal Izzy Schwartz. Brown beat him in 1925 but lost in a title bout to Schwartz for the NYSAC flyweight title on December 16, 1927.  One newspaper summarizing the bout wrote, "Corporal Izzy Schwartz...outscored Newsboy Brown of Sioux City, Iowa throughout to win recognition in New York as the holder of the Flyweight Championship vacated recently by Fidel LaBarba."  Apparently Schwartz demonstrated superior scientific boxing skills and was better trained for the bout, likely because he was five years older than Brown who had not yet reached the peak of his boxing skills at twenty-two.  The Norwalk Hour, perhaps showing some local bias, wrote of the well attended bout in Madison Square Garden, that Schwartz was "too fast, shifty, and resourceful, for the plodding Brown, and won hands down."  A more objective source noted that Brown had previously defeated Schwartz, and that he "entered as a slight favorite and forced the fighting throughout", despite losing in a unanimous decision.  Although it was a NYSAC World Title match, the bout was not the headliner for the night but merely a semi-final.  This was probably due to the greater popularity of other weight classes and the dispute over who held the World Flyweight Title at the time. Schwartz would receive his fair share of recognition for taking the Flyweight title and holding it for two years, but Brown would never reach the same level of notoriety holding the title for only eight months and only in the state of California.

World Fly champ, 1928 (California) 
In his next fight Brown won his most important and historic victory by beating Johnny McCoy on January 3, 1928, in a ten round bout for the flyweight world title as recognized in California.  According to  one source, "The Newsboy had lost only one fight in his last 15 in Los Angeles, and his last appearance–a defeat of Johnny Vacca–had been heralded as one of the best fights ever seen in the Olympic Auditorium." Brown won five rounds, McCoy only three, with two rounds even.  Brown led in the first seven rounds, before McCoy came back in the last three, knocking Brown to the canvas in the tenth, but it was too late to take the victory. Nonetheless, the results demonstrated that the boxers were evenly matched. Considering the decision, McCoy had waited too long to take control of the bout.

Flyweight Title loss 
Brown defended the Flyweight title once by beating Filipino Speedy Dado but lost it in when Johnny Hill won a decision over him on August 29, 1928, at the Orient Football Ground in London, becoming the first Scottish boxer to hold a world title.  Brown continued to show promise after losing the title, defeating Flyweight world champion Midget Wolgast in Los Angeles in a non-title fight on August 19, 1930, in a decisive ten round bout. Had Wolgast consented to fight the bout for a title, Brown's fame and recognition in the sport would have taken a positive turn. It would not be the first time a title holder would dodge a title match with Brown.  New London's The Day wrote, "Midget Wolgast recognized flyweight champ in New York and Pennsylvania, took a severe beating at the hands of Newsboy Brown, Los Angeles veteran trial horse, in a ten round non-title bout here."

Brown defeated Filipino Pablo Dano, a future holder of the World bantam title, on May 20, 1930, in a close ten round points decision unpopular with the audience at Olympic Auditorium in Los Angeles, but correct in the view of the Los Angeles Times.  Both boxers skilled defense prevented many shots to the head, making blows to the midsection more common in the match.  Brown had lost to Dano five months earlier in San Francisco.

Tommy Gardner, who held the Pacific Coast and Northwest Bantam titles,  fell to Brown on June 13, 1930, at Hollywood's Legion Stadium in a ten round points decision.  In a fast paced match, Gardner started with some well placed blows but Brown adjusted to his style, and showed superior speed over the course of the bout.

Brown was scheduled to meet Frankie Genaro for a second time on September 9, 1930, at the Olympic Auditorium in Los Angeles, but Genaro scheduled to fight Midget Wolgast instead, perhaps fearing that Brown could take back the National Boxing Association World Flyweight Title he held at the time or aware that a fight with champion Wolgast would be bring a bigger audience and be more lucrative.  According to the Prescott Evening Courier, "The Olympic Auditorium (where the bout was to take place) has requested the New York Commission to force Genaro to meet Brown here according to a telegraphic agreement...and the New York Athletic Commission has signified it may take similar action if Brown defeats Laredo." Whatever the reason, Brown defeated Mexican boxer Chato Laredo on September 9, 1930, in a decisive ten round match at the Olympic Auditorium but never again met Genaro, nor had a chance at the NBA Flyweight World Title. One explanation may be that Brown was beginning to move up in weight as he had originally scheduled to box Wolgast on September 9 over the flyweight limit. Brown would soon move up a weight class with considerable success.

Brown met Archie Bell in an eight round draw at Queensboro Stadium in Queens on August 18, 1931, in a fast match where much of the action occurred in the last round.  Bell was a recognized contender for both the World bantam and featherweight titles in his career.

California Bantam state champion 
He took the USA California Bantamweight State Championship on November 24, 1931, defeating Filipino boxer Young Tommy in a ten round points decision in Olympic Stadium in Los Angeles.  He successfully defended it again facing Young Tommy on January 30, 1932, in Los Angeles.

Win over Bantam champ Al Brown 
Though giving up ten inches in height, Newsboy Brown defeated "Panama" Al Brown, the reigning Bantamweight champion of the world on December 15, 1931, in a ten round main event at Los Angeles' Olympic Stadium.  Though it was a non-title bout, the Newsboy was said to "carry the fight all the way to the decision", in a surprising upset.  Most sources gave the Newsboy six rounds, with only three to Al Brown and one even.

World Feather title attempt 
He fought Speedy Dado twice in 1931, losing one bout and winning the second in a third round knockout in Los Angeles on March 3 for the California State bantam title.  In 1932 he fought his last title fight, losing a ten-round decision to Baby Arizmendi for the world featherweight title. According to one source Brown won only one round, explaining his reluctance to continue his career. He retired from boxing in 1933.

His managers included  Leo Flynn, Pop Nealis, Joe Levy, and by 1929, Tom Kennedy.  In 1931–1932, he was managed by Emmett Ledwith.

Achievements 
He was inducted into the International Boxing Hall of Fame in 2012.

Retirement and work in Hollywood 
After his boxing retirement, he broke into the motion picture business by coaching cowboy star Tom Mix in his fight scenes. As a result of his association with Mix, he landed a job in the properties department of one of the Hollywood studios, where he worked in his later years.

He helped with props for Columbia Picture's 1947 movie Johnny O'Clock directed by Robert Rossen.

He died on February 18, 1977, in Los Angeles, California where he had conducted both his boxing and acting careers.

Professional boxing record 
All information in this section is derived from BoxRec, unless otherwise stated.

Official record

All newspaper decisions are officially regarded as “no decision” bouts and are not counted in the win/loss/draw column.

Unofficial record

Record with the inclusion of newspaper decisions in the win/loss/draw column.

External links

References 

1905 births
1977 deaths
American people of Russian-Jewish descent
Flyweight boxers
World boxing champions
Jewish American boxers
Jewish boxers
Russian male boxers
Russian Jews
Place of birth missing
American male boxers
20th-century American Jews
Emigrants from the Russian Empire to the United States